Ametroglossus is a genus of ground beetles in the family Carabidae. This genus has a single species, Ametroglossus ater, found in Australia.

References

Anthiinae (beetle)